The 2015–16 Southern Illinois women's basketball team represents Southern Illinois University Carbondale during the 2015–16 NCAA Division I women's basketball season. The Salukis, led by third year head coach Cindy Stein. They played their home games at SIU Arena and were members of the Missouri Valley Conference. They finished the season 20–13, 12–6 in MVC play to finish in fourth place. They advanced to the semifinals of the Missouri Valley women's tournament where they lost to Southern Illinois. They were invited to the Women's Basketball Invitational where they lost to Western Illinois in the first round.

Roster

Schedule

|-
!colspan=9 style="background:#800000; color:white;"| Exhibition

|-
!colspan=9 style="background:#800000; color:white;"| Non-conference regular season

|-
!colspan=9 style="background:#800000; color:white;"| Missouri Valley regular season

|-
!colspan=9 style="background:#800000; color:white;"| Missouri Valley Women's Tournament

|-
!colspan=9 style="background:#800000; color:white;"| WBI

See also
2015–16 Southern Illinois Salukis men's basketball team

References

Southern Illinois Salukis women's basketball seasons
Southern Illinois
Southern Illinois